CCDP can mean:

 Communications Capabilities Development Programme, a UK government surveillance initiative
 Cisco Certified Design Professional, one of the Cisco Career Certifications